Bulbophyllum arfakianum is a species of orchid in the genus Bulbophyllum. This rare orchid is endemic to Arfak Mountains at elevations 50~400 meters in rainforests, Papua New Guinea.

Description

The species is slow-growing epiphyte with an ascending growth habit. Its pseudobulbs are ovoid, 1-leafed at the apex, spaced of about 2.5cm on a creeping rhizome. Leaves are oblong, dark green, 4.5~9cm long. Inflorescence is from the base of the pseudobulb and single-flowered, 14cm long. Flowers are 5cm long with a dorsal sepal with pointed apex bent forward. lateral sepals are falcate, converging at the apex. Flowers are colored with maroon macules.

References

The Bulbophyllum-Checklist
The Internet Orchid Species Photo Encyclopedia

External links

arfakianum
Plants described in 1904
Taxa named by Friedrich Wilhelm Ludwig Kraenzlin